A list of films produced in the United Kingdom in 1949 (see 1949 in film):

1949

See also
 1949 in British music
 1949 in British television
 1949 in the United Kingdom

References

External links
 

1949
Films
British
1940s in British cinema